Kearney Public Schools is a school district serving the area of Kearney, Nebraska, United States.

History

Schools
Elementary schools:
Bryant Elementary School
Buffalo Hills Elementary School
Central Elementary School
Emerson Elementary School
Glenwood Elementary School
Kenwood Elementary School
Meadowlark Elementary School
Northeast Elementary School
Park Elementary School
Windy Hills Elementary School

Middle schools:
Horizon Middle School
Sunrise Middle School

High schools:
Kearney High School

References

External links
Kearney Public Schools

Education in Buffalo County, Nebraska
School districts in Nebraska
Kearney, Nebraska